= USF Magazine =

USF Magazine may refer to the alumni magazines of the:

- University of San Francisco
- University of South Florida
